This article is about the Devīsūktam in the Ṛgveda.  This is different from Devisuktam/ Chandipath in Durgāsaptaśatī of Mārkaṃḍeyapurāṇa.

Text's Sequential Index 

(Indices of the seer, deity number of verses & metre) 

Text and meaning 

It is the illimitable, eternal, residual Pure Consciousness – the Substratum of both the ego (subject) and the universe (object).

Her words, perhaps, remain the boldest, uncompromising proclamations of the realisation of Advaitic (non-dualistic) Truth by any seer in the entire realm of the Vedas.

The : 

1.

2. I support the foe-destroying  and Bhaga; I bestow wealth upon the institutor of the rite offering the oblation (havis) - (who is) pouring forth the libation and deserving of careful protection. 

3. I am the sovereign queen (of all Existence), the collectress of treasures, cognizant of (the Supreme Being), the chief object of worship; as such, the gods have put me in many places, abiding in manifold conditions, entering into numerous (forms).

4. He who eats food (eats) through me; he who sees, who breathes, who hears what is spoken, does so through me; those who are ignorant of me, perish; hearken who is capable of hearing, I tell you that which is deserving of belief. 

5.

6. I bend the bow (to fasten the bow string at its ends) for Rudra, to slay the tormenting, Brahman-hating enemy. I wage war against (hostile) men (to protect the praying ones); I have pervaded the Heaven and earth. 

7. I bring forth the paternal (heaven - abode of the manes) upon the crown (brows) of (this Supreme Being); my genesis is from the waters (cosmic - the all pervading Entity); from thence, I pervade through all beings and reach this heaven with my body. 

8. I verily myself breathe forth like the wind, issuing out form to all the created worlds; beyond the heaven, beyond the world (I Exist eternally - beyond space & time) - so vast am I in my greatness.

Recitation 
An audio recording of the recitation of the Devīsūkta:

References 

 Online

Hindu texts
Sanskrit texts
Rigveda
Vedic hymns